Field hockey at the 2016 South Asian Games for women was held in Guwahati, India from 10 to 15 February 2016. This was the first ever women field hockey event at South Asian Games.

India won the gold medal by defeating Sri Lanka by 10–0.

Pool standings

Fixtures and results
All times are Indian Standard Time (IST) – UTC+05:30.

Gold-medal match

Winner

Statistics

Goal Scorers

Cards

Officials
* Source: 
Tournament Director
  Daljit Singh

Technical Officer

  Rakesh Bhatia
  Halinge Mithripala
  Uzma Rizvi

Judge

  Hassan Mohd Ali
  Rohini Bopanna
  Mohd Ahsan Jaleel
  Faheem Mohd Khan
  M. Fazeer Laheer
  Balaram Shresta

Umpires Manager
  Amarjit Singh

Neutral Umpire

  Binish Hayat
  Junko Wagatsuma
  Rama Potnis

References

External links
2016 South Asia Games (W) −FIH

2016 South Asian Games
South Asian Games
South Asian Games
South Asian Games, 2016